Mount Beshtor (also Беш-Тёр) rises to 4,299 m in Pskem Range in the north-eastern tip of Uzbekistan's Tashkent Province. Located on the southern border with Kyrgyzstan, a short distance to the south-west from another towering peak in Pskem Range, Mount Adelung (Adelunga Toghi, 4,301 m). Beshtor is the second highest peak in both Tashkent Province and the Pskem Range.

References
 Atlas of Soviet Republics of Central Asia, Moscow, 1988, in Russian, p. 22. 
 Big Soviet Encyclopedia, on-line edition, in Russian, accessed May 23, 2008.
 Coordinates from MapPlanet, accessed May 23, 2008.

Beshtor